12 Nights of Christmas is the fourteenth and final studio album by American R&B singer R. Kelly and his only Christmas album. Released on October 21, 2016, it is Kelly's final album with RCA Records before the label dropped him in January 2019 following numerous sexual assault allegations.

Background 
The album is Kelly's only album to incorporate a holiday theme. The album was supposed to be released in late 2014, but was instead postponed to 2016.

Commercial performance 
12 Nights of Christmas debuted at number 177 on the Billboard 200 chart for the week of December 24, 2016.

Track listing

Charts

Release history

References 

2016 Christmas albums
Albums produced by R. Kelly
R. Kelly albums
RCA Records Christmas albums
Christmas albums by American artists
Contemporary R&B Christmas albums